Fazail Ibrahimli (born 1951) is an Azerbaijani politician.

Ibrahimli has served as a member of parliament for four consecutive terms since 2000. In 2020, he became the vice speaker of the assembly.

He was born in Chanagbulag, Yardımlı. He attended Azerbaijan State Pedagogical University and received a degree in history. Later, he joined Baku State University and worked there as a student between 1979 and 1982.

In 1982, he joined the faculty of Baku State University and has served as a professor of history at the university.

In 1992, he joined Civil Solidarity Party.

Awards
 Shohrat Order

References

Living people
1951 births
Azerbaijani politicians
Academic staff of Baku State University